The 1979 Coca-Cola 500 was a NASCAR Winston Cup Series racing event that took place on July 30, 1979, at Pocono International Raceway in Long Pond, Pennsylvania.

By the following season, NASCAR had completely stopped tracking the year model of all the vehicles and most teams did not take stock cars to the track under their own power anymore. Only manual transmission vehicles were allowed to participate in this race; a policy that NASCAR has retained to the present day.

During qualifying an unnamed driver dared James Hylton to turn the slowest lap he could while qualifying. Hylton turned in a blistering 45 mph average for the lap, and NASCAR officials promptly fined him $500.

Background
Pocono Raceway is one of six superspeedways to hold NASCAR races; the others are Daytona International Speedway, Michigan International Speedway, Auto Club Speedway, Indianapolis Motor Speedway and Talladega Superspeedway. The track's turns are banked differently; the first is banked at 14°, the second turn at 8° and the final turn with 6°. However, each of the three straightaways are banked at 2°.

Race report
While originally scheduled for July 29, 1979, it was postponed one day due to rain. The race was run on Monday, so most of the NASCAR fans had to go work that day.

Two hundred laps were completed in four hours and twenty minutes. Seven cautions flags slowed the race for 49 laps; Cale Yarborough eventually defeated Richard Petty under the race's final yellow flag. This would result in Yarborough's third win of the year. Forty thousand fans attended a live racing event where the average speed of the vehicles would be . None of the drivers on the starting grid were born in Wisconsin; which is still true in 2016. The majority of the vehicles involved in the race had Chevrolet as their manufacturer. Steve Gray would make his NASCAR debut that resulted in a last-place finish. He crashed on the very first lap of the race with Roger Hamby and Al Holbert; taking home only $1,305 in winnings ($ when adjusted for inflation).

Darrell Waltrip pretty much lost the championship pitting late in the race and losing the led for good on lap 187. Had Darrell Waltrip kept on racing and toughed it out, Darrell Waltrip would have probably won a championship in 1979.

A freight train of cars ended up drafting and swapping positions for a majority of the event. It took 62 starts, but Ricky Rudd finally collects his first lead-lap finish in Winston Cup, nevertheless managing to collect 20 top-10s prior to this event.

Cale Yarborough would take home $21,465 in winnings for finishing first in the race ($ when adjusted for inflation). 56 lead changes were recorded in this race; a rarity outside Talladega Superspeedway and a definite record setter for Pocono Raceway. Dale Earnhardt fractured both of his clavicles by crashing into a wall on lap 98 of this race. As a result, he had to miss the next four races (re-emerging at the 1979 running of the Capital City 400). All of the 39 drivers that qualified for the race were American-born men.

Race results

Standings after the race

References

Coca-Cola 500
Coca-Cola 500
NASCAR races at Pocono Raceway